Last Scream of the Missing Neighbors is a punk album by Jello Biafra of Dead Kennedys and Canadian band D.O.A., released in 1990. It is notable for "Full Metal Jackoff," a furious 14-minute song that touches on then-relevant topics such as Willie Horton, the Iran-Contra Affair, Oliver North, the crack epidemic, and many others.

"That's Progress" was included on the Rock Against Bush, Vol. 1 compilation on Fat Wreck Chords.

Critical reception
Trouser Press praised the album, calling it "a roaring rock record that puts [Biafra's] trademark whiny vocals and songs to D.O.A.'s meat-and-cojones guitar power. Through a half-dozen numbers like "Wish I Was in El Salvador," "Attack of the Peacekeepers" and the epic "Full Metal Jackoff," Last Scream proudly re-hoists the DK flag in all but name."

Track listing
All songs by Jello Biafra except where indicated.

 "That's Progress" - 3:13
 "Attack of the Peacekeepers" - 2:44
 "Wish I Was in El Salvador" - 2:53
 "Power Is Boring" (Jello Biafra, Joe Keithley) - 2:49
 "We Gotta Get Out of This Place" (Barry Mann, Cynthia Weil; originally performed by The Animals) - 4:50
 "Full Metal Jackoff" - 13:57

Personnel
Jello Biafra - lead vocals
Joe Keithley - guitar, vocals
Chris Prohom - guitar, vocals
Brian Goble - bass
Jon Card - drums

References

1989 albums
Alternative Tentacles albums
Jello Biafra albums
D.O.A. (band) albums
Collaborative albums